Amigo de Aluguel is a Brazilian comedy television series  that premiered on Universal TV in Brazil on August 26, 2018.

The series is starred by Felipe Abib, and follows the story of Fred, a failed actor who happens to be a "Friend For Hire", which turns into the person you need, at the time you need it most.

Premise
With his professional life collapsing an unemployed actor (Fred) decides to become a "Friend For Hire" and make company for those who feel alone. However, in order to survive at this new environment he needs to be prepared to deal with the craziest situations.

Cast
 Felipe Abib	as Frederico (Fred) / João Paulo / Cauê Sol
 Luciana Paes	as Sara
 Thiago Amaral	as Jun Ho
 Christiana Ubach as	Angelina
 Julia Ianina	as Carla
 Enzo Barone	as Ivan
 César Mello	as Victor
 Gabriela Yoon	as Min Ha

References

External links

2018 Brazilian television series debuts
2010s Brazilian television series
Brazilian comedy television series
Portuguese-language television shows